An honors student or honor student is a student recognized for achieving high grades or high marks in their coursework at school.

United States

In the US, honors students may refer to:
 Students recognized for their academic achievement on lists published periodically throughout the school year, known as honors roll, varying from school to school, shows the student going above and beyond and from enlarged different levels of education.
 Students enrolled in designated honors courses or honors programs.
 Students who are members of the National Honor Society or other honor society.

Honors students are often recognized for their achievements. A student who has made numerous appearances on the honor roll may be awarded some form of academic letter, or any other form of notification. A similar concept to honor rolls exists in colleges and universities in the United States, known as the Dean's List.

A growing archive of honor students can be found online.   See references below.

Elsewhere in the world

In other countries, the meaning of honors can refer either to a specific type of academic degree or to the level of distinction with which an undergraduate degree was earned.

Honours degrees are usually four-year programs (sometimes also three-year programs, e.g., in England). A student who holds a de jure Honours degree is eligible for direct entry either to a Doctorate (Ph.D.) or to a two- to three years very-high-research Master's degree program.

'Honours' can also mean that students have achieved their degree with a high overall average GPA and typically have undertaken a small final project, paper or essay (also known in the UK as a dissertation). See British undergraduate degree classification.

A third meaning is a postgraduate with Honors or cum honored degree, which is (part of) an academic degree itself, e.g. the one-year Bachelor with Honors degree in Australia, the one-year Baccalaureatus Cum Honore degree in Canada or the four-year integrated Master with Honors degree in Scotland. Postgraduate Honors degree programs generally involve completion of master's level courses and the submission of a long high-research thesis.

Criticism 
Some researchers have questioned the validity of the honor roll as an effective form of positive reinforcement. It is argued that the pursuit of extrinsic reward is not an accurate reflection of intrinsic interest in course material. Many other criteria should also be employed to judge a student including standardized test scores, research experience, breadth and the level of courses taken, and academic-related extracurriculars performance. Writing honors thesis or semi-independent research in a subject may be more signal of interest or academic potential than achieving the label of "Honors Student." There are also questions on the effectiveness of separating high-achieving students from their peers, in the form of magnet schools or honors courses or Gifted and Talented Education

Honors courses 
An honors course is a class in which the most advanced students are placed. Most students placed in honors courses are highly motivated and dedicated to their educational experience. Honors classes also cover advanced material, permit more in-depth study than a standard course of study and may require independent research.

Motivation is the main quality that characterizes an honors student. In addition to being committed to academics, they are encouraged and many participate in volunteer work, organizations and clubs, cooperative education, research, study abroad and cultural activities.

Honors programs have specific entrance requirements and completion criteria in order to graduate with Honors, or cum laude.

See also 
 Academic freedom
 Advanced Placement
 International Baccalaureate
 Standardized test

References 

Types of students
Education in the United States